Roger Federer's 2019 tennis season officially began on 30 December 2018, with the start of the Hopman Cup. His season ended on 16 November 2019, with a loss in the semifinals of the ATP Finals. Despite failing to defend his title at the Australian Open, Federer was able to maintain his ranking of World No. 3 by the end of the year.

Year summary

Early hard court season

Hopman Cup
As in the past two seasons, Roger Federer paired with Belinda Bencic at the Hopman Cup, representing Switzerland. Federer defeated Cameron Norrie from Great Britain, Frances Tiafoe from the United States and Stefanos Tsitsipas from Greece, all in straight sets, to help Switzerland advance to the final. The tie against the United States was remarkable for staging the first-ever meeting between Federer and Serena Williams, considered one of the best female tennis players of all time, in a mixed doubles match alongside Bencic and Tiafoe.

With Federer defeating Alexander Zverev in straight sets, and like in the previous year, they defeated Germany 2–1 in the final to clinch Federer's third and Switzerland's fourth Hopman Cup title overall. The mixed doubles title match was decided in the final point, with Bencic forcing an error from Zverev to help Switzerland win the match and the tournament.

Australian Open

As the two-time defending champion, Federer entered the first Grand Slam tournament of the season, the Australian Open, as the No. 3 seed. His first match was a straight-sets victory over Denis Istomin, followed by another one against Daniel Evans. In the third round he defeated Taylor Fritz, again in straight sets, but was upset by Stefanos Tsitsipas in the fourth round, losing in four tight sets.

Being the defending champion and as a result of losing in the fourth round, he dropped out of the Top 5 in the ATP rankings. In a post-tournament interview, he admitted that he planned to play the clay court season in 2019, after two years of skipping it.

Dubai Tennis Championships
After skipping the tournament in 2018, Federer returned to Dubai to play the Dubai Tennis Championships. Having dropped to No. 7 in the world two weeks before, he was the tournament's No. 2 seed. In the first two rounds, he defeated Philipp Kohlschreiber and Fernando Verdasco in three sets, advancing to a quarterfinal match against Márton Fucsovics. Federer defeated Fucsovics in straight sets, booking his place in the semifinals to face the 22-year-old and No. 6 seed Borna Ćorić. He defeated Ćorić, also in straight sets, to set a final against another youngster, Stefanos Tsitsipas, in a rematch from their Australian Open encounter in January – which Federer lost. By defeating Tsitsipas in straight sets, Federer won the tournament and made history by becoming the second male tennis player in history to reach 100 singles titles. With his victory, he returned to No. 4 in the ATP rankings.

Indian Wells Masters
Fresh off his victory in Dubai, Federer began his participation in the Indian Wells Masters by defeating Peter Gojowczyk in straight sets on the second round, after getting a first round bye. He then defeated his fellow countryman Stan Wawrinka in dominant fashion, also in straight sets, to book his first ever meeting with Kyle Edmund in the fourth round. He defeated Edmund in straight sets to secure a place in the quarterfinals, setting up another first ever encounter with Hubert Hurkacz. Federer defeated Hurkacz, again in two sets, to set a blockbuster semifinal with Rafael Nadal, which would have been the thirty-ninth meeting in their famous rivalry. However, Nadal was forced to withdraw from the tournament due to a knee injury sustained in his last match – and therefore, Federer reached a record-breaking ninth tournament final. In the final, he was defeated by the No. 7 seed Dominic Thiem in a three-set match.

Miami Open
Federer next played in the Miami Open as the No. 4 seed, following the withdrawal of Rafael Nadal. This was the first edition of the tournament following the location change from Key Biscayne to the Hard Rock Stadium in Miami Gardens. After the usual first round bye, he defeated Radu Albot, Filip Krajinović and the No. 13 seed Daniil Medvedev in succession to advance to a quarterfinal match with the No. 6 seed Kevin Anderson. With a bagel in the first set, he defeated Anderson in straight sets. This was Federer's 1200th match win in his professional career, setting up a semifinal against the 19-year-old Denis Shapovalov – a first time encounter between the two. Federer ended up easily defeating Shapovalov to reach his third final of the season. He also became the first player to reach 50 Masters 1000 tournament finals, breaking the tie with Rafael Nadal. In the final, he defeated John Isner in straight sets to win the 28th Masters 1000 title of his career.

Spring clay court season

Madrid Open
For the first time in three years, Roger Federer committed to play the spring clay court season. His first tournament was the Madrid Open, a Masters 1000 tournament, which he played as the No. 4 seed. In his first clay court match since 2016, and after a first round bye, he defeated Richard Gasquet in straight sets – on the twentieth meeting between the two – in under an hour of play. In the third round, he defeated Gaël Monfils in three sets, with the final set decided in a tiebreak after saving two match points. Therefore, he reached the quarterfinals, where he lost to  Dominic Thiem in three sets – this time squandering two match points himself in the second set tiebreak.

Italian Open
Following the loss at the Madrid Open, Federer confirmed his presence at the Italian Open on the week after. After a first round bye, and due to a rain delay on the day before, Federer defeated João Sousa – in straight sets – and Borna Ćorić – in a third set tiebreak, saving once again two match points – on the same day, in the second and third rounds, respectively, to qualify for the quarterfinals. However, he was forced to withdraw before the match against Stefanos Tsitsipas due to a right leg injury.

French Open

For the first time in four years, Federer played the season's second and only clay court major, the French Open. He entered the tournament as the No. 3 seed and made a successful return by defeating Lorenzo Sonego in straight sets. He advanced to the quarterfinals without losing a set, defeating lucky loser Oscar Otte, 20-year-old Casper Ruud, and Leonardo Mayer, to set up an encounter with compatriot and 2015 champion Stan Wawrinka, who defeated him the last time he entered the tournament. After four tight sets, Federer defeated Wawrinka to set up a semifinal clash with Rafael Nadal, resuming their storied rivalry at the French Open for the sixth time. Federer ended up losing in straight sets to Nadal, ending his French Open run in the semifinals.

Grass court season

Halle Open
Federer opened his grass court season at the Halle Open, where he was a nine-time tournament winner, as the No. 1 seed. In the first round he defeated John Millman, who defeated him in the fourth round of last year's US Open. He then survived consecutive three-set battles against Jo-Wilfried Tsonga and Roberto Bautista Agut to advance to a fifteenth semifinal in Halle. There, he easily defeated Pierre-Hugues Herbert to reach a record-extending thirteenth final, where he bested David Goffin in straight sets to capture a record-extending tenth Halle title and No. 102 overall.  This marked the first time in his career that Federer won a single event 10 times.

Wimbledon

Due to his victory in Halle, Federer advanced to Wimbledon – the third Grand Slam of the season – as the No. 2 seed. He started the tournament with a four-set victory over Lloyd Harris. In the next three rounds, he defeated Jay Clarke, No. 27 seed Lucas Pouille and No. 17 seed Matteo Berrettini, without losing a set. In a quarterfinal clash with the world No. 7 Kei Nishikori, Federer won in four sets, advancing to his thirteenth Wimbledon semifinal and becoming the first man in history to win 100 matches at a Grand Slam tournament. Eleven years after their epic 2008 final, he defeated his rival Rafael Nadal in the semifinals after four sets. It was the fortieth encounter in their rivalry. Federer then faced Novak Djokovic in the final, against whom he lost in a five set thriller lasting four hours and fifty seven minutes, despite having two championship points on serve in the fifth set. The match also marked the first time that a fifth set tiebreaker was played at 12–12 in a singles match and was the longest men's final in Wimbledon history.

North American hard court season

Cincinnati Masters
Federer made his first appearance since the Wimbledon final at the Cincinnati Masters, the season's seventh Masters 1000 tournament, as the No. 3 seed, after withdrawing from the Canadian Open played the week before. After a first round bye, he defeated Juan Ignacio Londero, in the second round, on his opening match. In the third round, however, he lost in straight sets to Andrey Rublev.

US Open

Federer moved on to New York City to play the US Open, the season's last Grand Slam, as the No. 3 seed. He opened his participation with a four-set win against qualifier Sumit Nagal, booking a second round encounter with Damir Džumhur. With this first round win, he qualified for a record-extending seventeenth ATP Finals. Despite losing the first set again, he defeated Džumhur in four sets. Then, Federer easily defeated Daniel Evans in the third round and David Goffin in the fourth round, both in straight sets, in 80 and 79 minutes, respectively, to advance to the quarterfinals. This marked the thirteenth time that Federer has reached the quarterfinal stage at the US Open, tying Andre Agassi and only trailing Jimmy Connors' seventeen times. He lost to Grigor Dimitrov in a five-setter, despite having taken a two-sets-to-one lead.

Asian swing

Shanghai Masters
Federer's return to the ATP Tour level tournaments happened in Shanghai, for the Shanghai Masters. He was the No. 2 seed and therefore had a bye in the first round. In the second and third rounds, he defeated Albert Ramos Viñolas and David Goffin, both in straight sets, to advance to a quarterfinal meeting against Alexander Zverev. Despite having saved five match points in the second set, he ended up losing in three sets to Zverev.

European indoor hard court season

Swiss Indoors
Federer advanced to his hometown tournament, the Swiss Indoors, as the two-time defending champion. His first round match, against Peter Gojowczyk, is remarkable for being the 1500th match of his career. He easily defeated Gojowczyk, in the first round, and Radu Albot, in the second round, both in straight sets, to reach a quarterfinal match against Stan Wawrinka. However, due to a back injury, Wawrinka was forced to withdraw from the match – and therefore, Federer advanced to the semifinals. In the semifinals, he defeated the world No. 7 Stefanos Tsitsipas in straight sets, earning his fiftieth win of the season and successfully advancing to the tournament final. In the final, he defeated Alex de Minaur in straight sets to win a record-extending tenth Swiss Indoors title without dropping a set.

Paris Masters
In the following week, Federer was scheduled to play the last Masters 1000 tournament of the season, the Paris Masters. However, he had to withdraw from the tournament to manage his schedule and to prepare for the ATP Finals.

ATP Finals

The last official tournament of the season, for Federer, was the ATP Finals in London. As the No. 3 seed, he was drawn in the group Björn Borg along with Novak Djokovic, Dominic Thiem and Matteo Berrettini. His first match was a straight-set loss to Thiem, followed by a victory in straight sets against Berretini to keep him alive in the group standings. His last group match was a straight-set win against Djokovic, his first victory against him since the 2015 edition of the tournament. Therefore, he finished the group in second place and advanced to the semifinals. There, he lost in straight sets to Stefanos Tsitsipas, in the match that officially ended his season.

All matches
This table chronicles all the matches of Roger Federer in 2019, including walkovers (W/O) which the ATP does not count as wins.

Singles matches

Doubles matches

Hopman Cup matches

Singles

Mixed doubles

Exhibition matches

Singles

Doubles

Schedule

Singles schedule

Doubles schedule

Yearly records

Head-to-head matchups

ATP and Grand Slam sanctioned matches
Roger Federer has a  ATP match win–loss record in the 2019 season. Bold indicates player was ranked top 10 at time of at least one meeting. The following list is ordered by number of wins: 

  David Goffin 3–0
  Radu Albot 2–0
  Matteo Berrettini 2–0
  Borna Ćorić 2–0
  Daniel Evans 2–0
  Peter Gojowczyk 2–0
  John Isner 2–0
  Stan Wawrinka 2–0
  Stefanos Tsitsipas 2–2
  Kevin Anderson 1–0
  Roberto Bautista Agut 1–0
  Jay Clarke 1–0
  Alex de Minaur 1–0
  Damir Džumhur 1–0
  Kyle Edmund 1–0
  Taylor Fritz 1–0
  Márton Fucsovics 1–0
  Richard Gasquet 1–0
  Lloyd Harris 1–0
  Pierre-Hugues Herbert 1–0
  Hubert Hurkacz 1–0
  Denis Istomin 1–0
  Philipp Kohlschreiber 1–0
  Filip Krajinović 1–0
  Nick Kyrgios 1–0
  Juan Ignacio Londero 1–0
  Leonardo Mayer 1–0
  Daniil Medvedev 1–0
  John Millman 1–0
  Gaël Monfils 1–0
  Sumit Nagal 1–0
  Kei Nishikori 1–0
  Oscar Otte 1–0
  Lucas Pouille 1–0
  Albert Ramos Viñolas 1–0
  Casper Ruud 1–0
  Denis Shapovalov 1–0
  Lorenzo Sonego 1–0
  João Sousa 1–0
  Jo-Wilfried Tsonga 1–0
  Fernando Verdasco 1–0
  Novak Djokovic 1–1
  Rafael Nadal 1–1
  Grigor Dimitrov 0–1
  Andrey Rublev 0–1
  Alexander Zverev 0–1
  Dominic Thiem 0–3

ITF sanctioned matches
While these are official sanctioned matches per the ITF, the ATP does not count them in their totals. Bold indicates player was ranked top 10 at time of at least one meeting. The extra ITF matches are as follows:
  Cameron Norrie 1–0
  Frances Tiafoe 1–0
  Stefanos Tsitsipas 1–0
  Alexander Zverev 1–0

Finals

Singles: 6 (4 titles, 2 runner-ups)

Team competitions: 2 (2 titles)

Earnings
Bold font denotes tournament win

 Figures in United States dollars (USD) unless noted.

Awards
ATPTour.com Fans' Favourite
Record seventeenth consecutive award in career

See also
 2019 ATP Tour
 2019 Rafael Nadal tennis season
 2019 Novak Djokovic tennis season

References

External links
  
 ATP tour profile

Roger Federer tennis seasons
Federer
2019 in Swiss tennis
2019 in Swiss sport